Perotis is a genus of beetles in the family Buprestidae, containing the following species:

 Perotis aereiventris Reiche, 1861
 Perotis bruckmanni Heer, 1862
 Perotis chloranus (Laporte & Gory, 1836)
 Perotis cupratus (Klug, 1829)
 Perotis hausmanni Heyden, 1862
 Perotis laevigatus Massalogo, 1855
 Perotis lavateri Heer, 1847
 Perotis lugubris (Fabricius, 1777)
 Perotis margotanus (Novak, 1983)
 Perotis planidorsis Liskenne, 1994
 Perotis reditus Heyden, 1862
 Perotis striatus Spinola, 1837
 Perotis susannae (Novak, 1983)
 Perotis unicolor (Olivier, 1790)
 Perotis xerxes (Marseul, 1865)

References

Buprestidae genera